One Night in Lisbon is a 1941 American thriller film directed by Edward H. Griffith and starring Fred MacMurray, Madeleine Carroll and Patricia Morison.  It was one of a cycle of pro-British films produced in Hollywood before the United States' entry into the war in December 1941. The film is based on John Van Druten's 1931 British play There's Always Juliet, updated to include the current wartime situation.

Plot
Dwight Houston (Fred MacMurray), an American pilot from Texas, meets a British aristocrat in London amid bombing, and gets caught up in a Nazi spy plot in Portugal.  At first Houston is critical of Britain, due to what he perceives to be a condescending attitude on the part of Leonora Perrycoate (Madeleine Carroll); however, he soon realizes in fact that as American he has much in common with them, and that their fight is his fight, remarking poignantly that "It's funny about England and the way Americans feel about you.  It's sort of like being related in a way.  You know the way you feel about relatives.  They do a lot of things that irritate you, but when it comes right down to it, you are related.  You have the same ideas, speak the same language and have the same plans for the future," and he realizes that he "shares with them a common history, heritage, language and political ideology"

Cast
Fred MacMurray as Dwight Houston
Madeleine Carroll as Leonora Perrycoate
Patricia Morison as Gerry Houston
John Loder as Cmdr. Peter Walmsley
Billie Burke as Catherine Enfilden
May Whitty as Florence
Edmund Gwenn as Lord Fitzleigh
Reginald Denny as Erich Strasser
Billy Gilbert as Popopopoulos
Marcel Dalio as Concierge
Bruce Wyndham as Strasser's Aide

References

Bibliography
Dick, Bernard F. The Star-Spangled Screen: The American World War II Film. University Press of Kentucky, 1996.
Glancy, H. Mark. When Hollywood Loved Britain: The Hollywood 'British' Film 1939-1945. Manchester University Press, 1999.

External links

1941 films
1940s thriller films
American films based on plays
American thriller films
1940s English-language films
Films scored by Victor Young
Films directed by Edward H. Griffith
Films set in Lisbon
Films set in London
Paramount Pictures films
World War II spy films
American black-and-white films
1940s American films